Anne-Cécile Robert is a French journalist specializing in European institutions and Africa, a member of the editorial board and management board of Le Monde diplomatique. She is particularly interested in political and institutional systems and democracy, its limitations and operations.

PhD in European Union law, Anne-Cécile Robert is also associate professor at the Institute of European Studies of the université Paris-VIII.

She opposed the Treaty establishing a Constitution for Europe.

She is vice-president of the association for a constituent.

Works 
2001: with : Un Totalitarisme tranquille : La démocratie confisquée . Syllepse
2003: with André Bellon et Claude Nicolet: Le Peuple inattendu. Syllepse
2004: L'Afrique au secours de l'Occident, preface by Boubacar Boris Diop, postface by Pierre Kipré.
2008: with Jean-Christophe Servant: Afriques années zéro, Editions Atalante
2018: La stratégie de l'émotion, preface by Eric Dupond-Moretti.

References

External links 
 Anne-Cécile Robert on Africulture
 
 La stratégie de l’émotion in Le Monde diplomatique
 Irréductible in Le Monde diplomatique

21st-century French journalists
Living people
Year of birth missing (living people)
French women journalists
21st-century French women